Thomas Alva Yon (March 14, 1882 – February 16, 1971) was an American politician and businessman who served in the United States House of Representatives as a Democrat.

Life

Thomas Alva Yon was born to Higdon Almarin Yon and Laura D. Lockey near Blountstown, Florida on March 14, 1882. At the age of five, his family moved to a farm in Jackson County, Florida. Yon attended rural schools and graduated from Lanier Southern Business College in Macon, Georgia in 1903. He returned to Blountstown in 1903 and engaged in mercantile pursuits until 1906. He engaged as a traveling salesman in Tallahassee, Florida from 1906 to 1927. He served as delegate to the 1920 Democratic National Convention.

Yon was elected as a Democrat to the United States House of Representatives in the 1926 elections, and was twice re-elected, serving from March 4, 1927 to March 4, 1933, in the 70th, 71st, and 72nd Congresses. He was an unsuccessful candidate for renomination in 1932. He was a supporter of the building of Naval Air Station Pensacola. During the 1932 Democratic Party presidential primaries he supported Governor Franklin D. Roosevelt for the nomination.

Yon served as a special and commercial agent in the Bureau of Foreign and Domestic Commerce of the United States Department of Commerce in Washington, D.C. from 1933 to 1940. He served as assistant investigator in the Division of Investigation of the General Accounting Office from 1941 until his retirement in January 1946. Yon engaged in development and sale of his Florida real estate holdings after retirement.

On February 16, 1971 Yon died in Tallahassee, Florida in 1971, and was interred in Oakland Cemetery.

Electoral history

References

External links

1882 births
1971 deaths
20th-century American politicians
Democratic Party members of the United States House of Representatives from Florida
People from Blountstown, Florida
People from Jackson County, Florida